Pyramidula umbilicata is a species of air-breathing land snail, a terrestrial pulmonate gastropod mollusk in the family Pyramidulidae.

Shell description 
The width of the shell is up to 2.2 mm, the height is up to 2.7 mm.

Distribution 
This species occurs in:
 Spain - in the south of the Iberian peninsula
 southern Portugal (according to Gittenberger 1996, but not mentioned in later article by Martínez-Ortí 2007)

References

Pyramidulidae
Gastropods described in 1882